Yubileynoye is a rural locality (a selo) and the administrative centre of Kizlyarsky Selsoviet, Kizlyarsky District, Republic of Dagestan, Russia. The population was 777 as of 2010. There are 31 streets.

Geography 
It is located 2 km northeast of Kizlyar.

Nationalities 
Russians, Avars, Dargins, Armenians and Azerbaijanis live there.

References 

Rural localities in Kizlyarsky District